Two-time defending champions Martina Navratilova and Pam Shriver defeated Claudia Kohde-Kilsch and Eva Pfaff in the final, 7–5, 6–2 to win the doubles tennis title at the 1983 Virginia Slims Championships. It was Navratilova's sixth Tour Finals doubles title, and Shriver's third.

Seeds
Champion seeds are indicated in bold text while text in italics indicates the round in which those seeds were eliminated. The top two seeded teams received byes into the semifinals.

Draw

External links
 1983 Virginia Slims Championships Doubles Draw

WTA Tour Championships
1983 Virginia Slims World Championship Series